Marbin-e Vosta Rural District is a rural district (dehestan) in the Central District of Khomeyni Shahr County, Isfahan Province, Iran. At the 2006 census, its population was 1,272, in 350 families.  The rural district has 3 villages.

References 

Rural Districts of Isfahan Province
Khomeyni Shahr County